, or JSL, was the top flight association football league in Japan between 1965 and 1992, and was the precursor to the current professional league, the J.League. JSL was the second national league of a team sport in Japan after the professional Japanese Baseball League that was founded in 1936. JSL was the first-ever national league of an amateur team sport in Japan.

History

Each JSL team represented a corporation, and like Japanese baseball teams, went by the name of the company that owned the team. Unlike in baseball, however, promotion and relegation was followed, as J.League follows today. The players were officially amateur and were employees of the parent corporations, but especially in later years, top players were generally paid strictly to play soccer.

Originally the JSL consisted of a single division only, but in 1972 a Second Division was added. Clubs could join in by winning the All Japan Senior Football Championship cup competition and then winning a promotion/relegation series against the bottom teams in the JSL. From 1973 to 1980, both the champions and runners-up of the Second Division had to play the promotion/relegation series against the First Division's bottom clubs; afterwards and until 1984, only the runners-up had to play the series.

Top JSL teams included Hitachi Ltd., Furukawa Electric, Mitsubishi Heavy Industries, Nissan Motors, Toyo Industries (Mazda) and Yomiuri Shimbun, which are now, respectively, Kashiwa Reysol, JEF United Chiba, Urawa Red Diamonds, Yokohama F. Marinos, Sanfrecce Hiroshima and Tokyo Verdy. Furukawa/JEF United was the only one never to be relegated to the Second Division and kept this distinction until 2009.

JSL played its final season in 1991/92 and the J.League began play in 1993. Top nine JSL clubs, (along with the independent Shimizu S-Pulse) became the original J.League members. The others except Yomiuri Junior who merged with their parent club Yomiuri Club joined the newly formed Japan Football League.

Champions

Division 1

All clubs are listed under the names they were using in 1991–92, when the league ceased to exist. Clubs in italic no longer exist.

Division 2

All clubs are listed under the names they were using in 1991–92, when the league ceased to exist. Clubs in italic no longer exist.

League Cup
See JSL Cup.

Konica Cup
See Konica Cup (football).

All-time JSL member clubs

Current J.League identity and/or standing in the Japanese football league system follows each name.

Original clubs
Furukawa Electric (1965–1992), became JEF United Chiba
Hitachi SC (1965–1992), became Kashiwa Reysol
Mitsubishi Motors (1965–1992), became Urawa Red Diamonds
Toyota Industries (1965–1968, 1972–1973), became Toyota Industries SC
Nagoya Mutual Bank (1965–1966, 1968–1971), became Nagoya WEST FC
Yanmar Diesel (1965–1992), became Cerezo Osaka
Toyo Industries / Mazda (1965–1992), became Sanfrecce Hiroshima
Yawata Steel / Nippon Steel (1965–1991), became Nippon Steel Yawata SC, defunct

Other First Division Clubs
In order of their promotion to the top-flight:
Nippon Kokan (Nippon Steel Piping) / NKK SC (1967–1992), defunct
Towa Real Estate / Fujita Industry / Fujita (1972–1992), became Shonan Bellmare
Toyota Motor (1972–1992), became Nagoya Grampus
Tanabe Pharmaceutical (1972–1992), became Tanabe Mitsubishi Pharma SC, defunct
Eidai Industries (1972–1977), became Eidai SC, defunct
Fujitsu SC (1972–1992), became Kawasaki Frontale
Yomiuri FC (1972–1992), became Tokyo Verdy
Nissan Motor (1976–1992), became Yokohama F. Marinos
Yamaha Motor (1979–1992), became Júbilo Iwata
Honda (1975–1992), became Honda FC
Sumitomo Metal (1973–1992), became Kashima Antlers
Yokohama Tristar / All Nippon Airways SC (1983–1992), became Yokohama Flügels, defunct
Matsushita Electric (1984–1992), became Gamba Osaka
Toshiba (1978–1992), became Hokkaido Consadole Sapporo

Notable Second Division clubs
Many of these clubs would only be promoted to the top-flight after the J.League was created.
Kofu Club (1972–1992), became Ventforet Kofu
Kyoto Shiko Club (1972–1978, 1988–1992), became Kyoto Purple Sanga and then Kyoto Sanga. Note that phoenix Kyoto Shiko Club was formed in 1993 and now competes in the Kansai Soccer League.
Kawasaki Steel (1986–1992), became Vissel Kobe
NTT Kanto (1987–1992), became Omiya Ardija
Otsuka Pharmaceutical (1990–1992), became Tokushima Vortis
Tokyo Gas (1992), became FC Tokyo
Chūō Bohan (Central Crime Prevention, 1992), became Avispa Fukuoka
TDK SC (1985–1987), became Blaublitz Akita

All-time JSL First Division table
A total of 22 teams played in the JSL First Division between 1965 and 1991–92. Fifteen of these became professional J.League clubs; the rest were relegated to the regional leagues and/or folded.

Despite Mazda and Yomiuri's record five titles, Mitsubishi holds the record on points. Furukawa Electric holds the record for most seasons, all 27 the JSL played, never been relegated.

Name changes made outside First Division play and following the advent of the J.League system are not mentioned; see individual club pages for more information. "Current division" means standing in the Japanese league system as of 2022 season.

In this ranking, three points are awarded for a win, one for a draw, and zero for a loss, regardless of the transition of regulation through the time as follows:
1965–1976, 1980 to 1987–88: 2 points for a win, 1 per draw, 0 per loss.
1977–1979: 4 points for a regulation time win, 2 for winning penalty shoot-out after a draw, 1 for a penalty shoot-out loss, 0 for a regulation time loss.
1988–89 to 1991–92: 3 points for a win, 1 per draw, 0 per loss.

See also
:Category:Japan Soccer League players
:Category:Japan Soccer League seasons

References

External links
Final tables from 1965 on (First Division only) at rsssf.com
Soccerphile: History of Japanese football
BBC Sport: "How football went Japanese"
Contents of Domestic Competition of Football in Japan
JSL Ganbare!

 
1
Sports leagues established in 1965
Organizations disestablished in 1992
Defunct top level football leagues in Asia